UNESCO Reclining Figure 1957–58 is a sculpture by Henry Moore. It was made in a series of scales, from a small plaster maquette, through a half-size working model made in plaster and cast in bronze (LH 415), to a full-size version carved in Roman travertine marble in 1957–1958 (LH 416). The final work was installed in 1958 at the World Heritage Centre, the headquarters of UNESCO (the United Nations Educational, Scientific and Cultural Organisation) at the Place de Fontenoy in Paris. This was Moore's last major public commission in which he created a new work for a specific site; he afterwards generally worked from an existing sketch or model.

Background
Moore was commissioned in 1955 to create a sculpture for the piazza in front of UNESCO's new headquarters in Paris, designed by the architect Marcel Breuer. Early ideas included groups of standing or seated figures, such as Draped Reclining Woman 1957–58 and Draped Seated Woman 1957–58, but he settled on a single and more abstract reclining figure for the UNESCO commission.  Some of his early drawings are held by the British Museum.

Description
Moore took several maquettes to Paris in February 1957 for UNESCO representatives to select the best one. The selected sculpture depicts the abstracted form of a reclining female human figure, with recognisable arms, torso, and legs, and a disproportionately small head, with hollows representing eyes.  Parallels can be drawn with his early stone Reclining Figure 1929 and his elmwood Reclining Figure 1935–6.  Moore made the suggestion that the final work should be carved in white stone, to contrast with the dark windows of the building behind, rather than casting it in bronze as originally intended.

Working model

Moore completed a half-size working plaster model in August 1957, which measures .  This model was made by applying layers of plaster to an armature, the surface of which was then worked with chisels and other tools.

The plaster working model is held by the Art Gallery of Ontario. One example of the  bronze is held by the Tate Gallery (cast 2/5). Other examples are held in the collections of the Carnegie Museum of Art in Pittsburgh, the Chicago Art Institute, the Stedelijk Museum in Amsterdam (cast 4/5), and the Kunsthaus Zürich (cast 5/5).

Full-size sculpture
Moore visited frequently to check on how the work was progressing, and to finish parts roughed out by the Italian workmen. He took his wife Irina and daughter Mary on one trip, and instituted a tradition of taking regular summer holidays in the area, later buying his own cottage.

It was installed near the new Y-shaped UNESCO building at the Place de Fontenoy in Paris in October 1958, and it was in place when the building was inaugurated the following month. The sculpture was moved in 1963, when UNESCO extended its offices, and it is now sited near Building IV.

See also
List of sculptures by Henry Moore

References

 Moore, Henry (1898–1986), Reclining Figure, UNESCO works of art collection
 "Reclining Figure" (1958), UNESCO
 The Henry Moore Sculpture Centre , Art Gallery of Ontario
 UNESCO Reclining Figure, LH 416, Henry Moore Foundation
 Working Model for UNESCO Reclining Figure, LH 415 cast 4, Henry Moore Foundation
 Working Model for UNESCO Reclining Figure, LH 415 cast 0, Henry Moore Foundation
 Maquette for UNESCO Reclining Figure, 1957, Art Institute Chicago
 Henry Moore, Working Model for UNESCO Reclining Figure 1957, cast c. 1959–61, Tate Gallery
 Working Model for UNESCO Reclining Figure, Tate Gallery
 Henry Moore – Writings and Conversations, pp. 71–72, 286–87

1958 sculptures
Outdoor sculptures in France
Sculptures by Henry Moore
Sculptures in Paris
Sculptures of women
Stone sculptures in France
UNESCO